Duplex hollowayi is a moth of the family Erebidae first described by Michael Fibiger in 2008. It is known from Seram Island in Indonesia.

The wingspan is about 9 mm. The forewing has a bright, ovoid, yellow reniform stigma. All crosslines present and black. The antemedial line is angled subcostally. The postmedial and subterminal lines are slightly waved and the terminal line is marked by tight black interveinal spots. The underside of the forewing is light brown.

References

Micronoctuini
Taxa named by Michael Fibiger
Moths described in 2008